Tithorea harmonia, the Harmonia tiger-wing or Harmonia tiger, is a species of butterfly belonging to the family Nymphalidae.

Description
This toxic "tiger" butterfly has the usual pattern of black wings with bright orange bands. The forewings have a black tip. Also the antennae are orange. Larvae feed on Prestonia species.

Distribution
This widespread species can be found from Mexico to South America.

Subspecies

Listed alphabetically:
 T. h. brunnea Haensch, 1905 (Peru)
 T. h. caissara (Zikán, 1941) (Brazil)
 T. h. cuparina Bates, 1862 (Brazil)
 T. h. dorada Brown, 1977 (Venezuela)
 T. h. egaensis Butler, 1873 (Brazil)
 T. h. flacilla Godman & Salvin, 1898 (Colombia)
 T. h. furia Staudinger, 1884 (Ecuador - Venezuela)
 T. h. furina Godman & Salvin, 1898 (Colombia)
 T. h. gilberti Brown, 1977 (Peru)
 T. h. harmonia (Surinam, Venezuela, French Guiana)
 T. h. helicaon Godman & Salvin, 1879 (Nicaragua - Panama, Costa Rica)
 T. h. hermias Godman & Salvin, 1898 (Ecuador, Amazon)
 T. h. hermina Haensch, 1903 (Ecuador)
 T. h. hippothous Godman & Salvin, 1879 (Guatemala)
 T. h. irene (Drury, 1782) (Panama)
 T. h. lateflava (Haensch, 1909) (Bolivia)
 T. h. manabiana Fox, 1956 (Ecuador)
 T. h. martina Fox, 1956 (Peru)
 T. h. megara (Godart, 1819) (Trinidad)
 T. h. melanina Haensch, 1905 (Peru)
 T. h. neitha Hopffer, 1874 (Peru)
 T. h. pseudethra Butler, 1873 (Brazil)
 T. h. pseudonyma Staudinger, 1894 (Bolivia)
 T. h. salvadoris Staudinger, 1885 (El Salvador)
 T. h. sulphurata (Zikán, 1941) (Brazil)

References

Ithomiini
Fauna of Brazil
Nymphalidae of South America
Butterflies described in 1777